Göttingen is a double-CD live album by pianist Cecil Taylor. It was recorded at the Junges Theater in Göttingen, Germany in September 1990, and was released in 2021 by Fundacja Słuchaj!. On the album, Taylor is joined by an ensemble of a dozen musicians. The recording took place roughly two years after the concert documented on Legba Crossing, and features many of the same players.

Reception

In a review for The New York City Jazz Record, Phil Freeman called the album "an important release for anyone interested in mapping the many pathways the pianist traveled down in his six-decade artistic journey." He commented: "Taylor's playing is thunderous, but
never dominant; he has given the other musicians plenty of material to work with and the horns take extended solos and engage in dialogue and larger conversations. The bassists and drummers create an ambient rumble rather than attempt to impose time and violin rarely pierces the storm of sound, but in the quieter moments when it does, it is a striking and vital addition to the musical environment."

Writing for JazzWord, Ken Waxman stated that the "individual pieces hang together with asides such as gutbucket-style trombone smears, formalized bass clarinet lowing... screechy brass whinnies, excursions into Energy Music saxophone runs and massed string glissandi subsumed as part of orchestral color... the group's strained tonal sections and undulating full-orchestra crescendos segmented by waves of kinetic piano dynamics... add up to a unique Taylor vision deftly interpreted by the band."

Track listing
Composed by Cecil Taylor.

Disc 1
 "Set 1 – Part One" – 44:04
 "Set 1 – Part Two" – 28:24

Disc 2
 "Set 2 – Part One" – 43:34
 "Set 2 – Part Two" – 12:58
 "Encore" – 9:33

Personnel 
 Cecil Taylor – piano, voice
 Joachim Gies – alto saxophone, soprano saxophone
 Martin Speicher – alto saxophone, baritone saxophone
 Ove Volquartz – soprano saxophone, tenor saxophone, bass clarinet, contra-alto clarinet
 Tobias Netta – trumpet
 Heinz-Erich Gödecke – trombone
 Harald Kimmig – violin
 Alexander Frangenheim – bass
 Uwe Martin – bass
 Georg Wolf – bass
 Kojo Samuels – percussion, balafon, elephant horn
 Lukas Lindenmaier – drums
 Peeter Uuskyla – drums

References

2021 live albums
Cecil Taylor live albums
Fundacja Słuchaj! live albums